Raghd Magdy (born 7 March 1983) is an Egyptian table tennis player, born in Iraq. She competed in women's team at the 2012 Summer Olympics in London.

References

External links

1983 births
Living people
Egyptian female table tennis players
Olympic table tennis players of Egypt
Table tennis players at the 2012 Summer Olympics